Oenopota cingulata is a species of sea snail, a marine gastropod mollusk in the family Mangeliidae.

Description
The length of the shell varies between 8 mm and 9.5 mm.

Distribution
This species occurs in the Okhotsk Sea.

References

External links
 
 

cingulata
Gastropods described in 1977